Pseudonemesia kochalkai is a species of spider in the family Microstigmatidae. It was first described by Robert J. Raven & Norman I. Platnickin 1981. It is found in Colombia.

References

Spiders of South America
Microstigmatidae
Spiders described in 1981